Pilates is a type of mind-body exercise developed in the early 20th century by German physical trainer Joseph Pilates, after whom it was named. Pilates called his method "Contrology". It is practiced worldwide, especially in countries such as Australia, Canada, South Korea, the United States and the United Kingdom. As of 2005, approximately 11 million people were practicing the discipline regularly, and there were 14,000 instructors in the US.

Pilates developed in the aftermath of the late 19th-century physical culture of exercising to alleviate ill health. There is, however, only limited evidence to support the use of Pilates to alleviate problems such as lower back pain. While studies have found that regular sessions improve balance, and can help muscle conditioning in healthy adults (compared to doing no exercise), it has not been shown to be an effective treatment for any medical condition

History 
Pilates was developed by Joseph Pilates from Mönchengladbach, Germany. His father was a gymnast and his mother a naturopath.  

During the first half of the twentieth century, Pilates developed a system of exercises intended to strengthen the human mind and body, believing that mental and physical health were interrelated.

In his youth, he practiced many of the physical training regimens available in Germany, and it was from these he developed his own method. It has clear connections with the physical culture of the late nineteenth century, such as the use of special apparatuses, and claims that the exercises could cure ill health. It is also related to the tradition of "corrective exercise" or "medical gymnastics" as typified by Pehr Henrik Ling.

Pilates said that the inspiration for his method came to him during World War I, while he was being held at the Knockaloe internment camp on the Isle of Man. He spent four years there developing his method, working on his fellow internees.

Pilates accompanied his method with a variety of equipment, which he called "apparatus". Each apparatus was designed to help accelerate the process of stretching, strengthening, body alignment and increased core strength started by mat work. The best-known and most popular apparatus today, the Reformer, was originally called the Universal Reformer, aptly named for "universally reforming the body". Eventually Pilates designed other apparatus, including the Cadillac, Wunda Chair, High "Electric" Chair, Spine Corrector, Ladder Barrel and Pedi-Pole.

He published two books related to his training method: Your Health: A Corrective System of Exercising That Revolutionizes the Entire Field of Physical Education (1934) and Return to Life Through Contrology (1945).

His first students went on to teach his methods, including: Romana Kryzanowska, Kathy Grant, Jay Grimes, Ron Fletcher, Mary Bowen, Carola Treir, Bob Seed, Eve Gentry, Bruce King, Lolita San Miguel, and Mary Pilates, Joseph's niece. Contemporary Pilates includes both the "Modern" Pilates and the "Classical/Traditional" Pilates. Modern Pilates is partly derived from the teaching of some first generation students, while Classical Pilates aims to preserve the original work as Joseph Pilates taught it.

Description 

A systematic review of Pilates in 2012 examined its literature to form a consensus description of it, and found it could be described as "a mind-body exercise that requires core stability, strength, and flexibility, and attention to muscle control, posture, and breathing".

In his book Return to Life through Contrology, Joseph Pilates presented his method as the art of controlled movements, which should look and feel like a workout (not a therapy) when properly done. If practiced consistently, Pilates improves flexibility, builds strength, and develops control and endurance in the entire body. It puts emphasis on alignment, breathing, developing a strong core, and improving coordination and balance. The core, consisting of the muscles of the abdomen, low back and hips, is often called the "powerhouse" and is thought to be the key to a person's stability. Pilates' system allows for exercises to be modified in difficulty, from beginner to advanced or any other level, and to accommodate the instructor's and practitioner's goals and/or limitations. They're intensity can be increased as the body adapts itself to the exercises.

A number of versions of Pilates are taught today; most are based on up to nine principles.

Effectiveness 
In 2015 the Australian Government's Department of Health published a meta study which reviewed the existing literature on 17 alternative therapies, including Pilates, to determine whether any were suitable for being covered by health insurance. The review found that due to the small number and methodologically limited nature of the existing studies, the effectiveness of Pilates was uncertain. Accordingly, in 2017, the Australian government named it a practice that would not qualify for insurance subsidy, saying this step would "ensure taxpayer funds are expended appropriately and not directed to therapies lacking evidence".

For the treatment of lower back pain, low-quality evidence suggests that while Pilates is better than doing nothing, it is no more effective than other forms of physical exercise. There is some evidence that regular sessions can help condition the abdominal muscles of healthy people, when compared to doing no exercise. There is no good evidence that it helps improve balance in elderly people.

Comparison with yoga 
Modern yoga, like Pilates, is a mind-and-body discipline, though yoga classes are more likely to address spiritual aspects explicitly. Some poses are similar in the two disciplines; for example, open leg balance closely resembles Navasana (boat pose); roll over is similar to Halasana (plough pose); and swan and push-up are essentially identical to Bhujangasana (cobra pose) and Chaturanga Dandasana (low plank pose). Both disciplines develop strength, flexibility and fitness. Pilates, however, emphasises core strength where yoga emphasizes flexibility.

Legal status
Pilates is not professionally regulated.

In October 2000 "Pilates" was ruled a generic term by a U.S. federal court, making it free for unrestricted use. The term is still capitalized in writing due to its origin from the proper name of the method's founder.

As a result of the court ruling, the Pilates Method Alliance was formed as a professional association for the Pilates community. Its purpose was to provide an international organization to connect teachers, teacher trainers, studios, and facilities dedicated to preserving and enhancing the legacy of Joseph H. Pilates and his exercise method by establishing standards, encouraging unity, and promoting professionalism.

See also 
 Calisthenics
 Meditation
 Squatting position
 Yoga

References

Further reading

External links 
 

 
Bodyweight exercises
Physical culture
Physical exercise
Mind–body interventions